Unión Deportiva Ibiza "B" is a Spanish football team based in Ibiza, in the Balearic Islands. Founded in 2022, they are the reserve team of UD Ibiza, and play in the Regional Preferente de Ibiza-Formentera.

History
Ibiza B were created in May 2022, as UD Ibiza wanted a "medium to long-term project" in the "formation of players". The new club started to play in the Regional Preferente de Ibiza-Formentera, while Ibiza ended their affiliation with CF Sant Rafel.

In July 2022, Ibiza B announced former player Sergio Cirio as their manager.

Season to season

See also
UD Ibiza

References

External links
 
La Preferente team profile 
Soccerway team profile

Football clubs in the Balearic Islands
Association football clubs established in 2022
2022 establishments in Spain
Spanish reserve football teams
Sport in Ibiza